Qeshlaq-e Gazlu Hajji Yunes (also Romanized as Qeshlāq-e Gāzlū Ḩājjī Yūnes) is a village in Qeshlaq Rural District, Abish Ahmad District, Kaleybar County, East Azerbaijan Province, Iran. At the 2006 census, its population was 161, in 33 families.

References 

Populated places in Kaleybar County